The following are the national records in athletics in Oman maintained by Oman Athletic Association (OAA).

Outdoor

Key to tables:
  

h = hand timing

nw = no wind measurement

# = not officially ratified by federation and IAAF

Men

Women

Indoor

Men

Women

References
General
World Athletics Statistic Handbook 2019: National Outdoor Records
World Athletics Statistic Handbook 2018: National Indoor Records
Specific

External links

Oman
Records
Athletics
Athletics